Franklin Square Historic District is a national historic district located at Oswego in Oswego County, New York.  The district includes 93 contributing buildings and one contributing site.

It was listed on the National Register of Historic Places in 1982.

References

Historic districts on the National Register of Historic Places in New York (state)
Historic districts in Oswego County, New York
National Register of Historic Places in Oswego County, New York